Sommer is a surname, from the German, Anglo-Saxon and Scandinavian languages word for the season "summer".

Notable people with this name include:

A–L
 Alfred Sommer (born 1943), American academic
 Alice Herz-Sommer (1903–2014), Czech-born Jewish pianist, oldest Holocaust survivor
 António de Sommer Champalimaud (1918–2004), Portuguese banker and industrialist
 Bert Sommer (1949–1990), American musician and actor
 Christine Sommer (born 1970), Austrian actress
 Clifford C. Sommer (1908-1993), American businessman and politician
 Coleen Sommer (born 1960), American high jumper
 Daniel Sommer (1850–1940), key figure in the Restoration Movement
 Édouard Sommer (born 1822), French scholar
 Elke Sommer (born 1940), German actress
 Erik Sommer (born 1978), artist
 Evrim Sommer (born 1971), German politician (The Left)
 Frederick Sommer (1905–1999), artist
 Gerhard Sommer (1921–2019), German Nazi officer accused of war crimes
 Giorgio Sommer (1834–1914), 19th-century photographer
 Günter Sommer (born c. 1943), German jazz musician
 Hans Sommer (SS officer) (1914–?), German Nazi officer (SS-Obersturmführer)
 Hans Sommer (composer) (1837–1922), German opera composer
  (1904–2000), German film music composer
 Heather Sommer, American Pop Singer/Songwriter
 Iris Sommer (born 1970), Dutch psychiatrist
 Jason Sommer, American poet and academic
 Joe Sommer (1858–1938), American baseball player
 Josef Sommer (born 1934), American film actor
 Johann Wilhelm Ernst Sommer (1881–1952), bishop of the Methodist Church
 Juergen Sommer (born 1969) American soccer goalkeeper
 Keith P. Sommer (born 1946), Republican politician
 Kostas Sommer (born 1975), Greek actor
 Luke Elliott Sommer (born 1986), former United States Army Ranger and bank robber

M–Z
 Manfred Sommer (1933–2007), Spanish comics creator
 Michael Sommer (born 1952), chairman of Deutscher Gewerkschaftsbund (Federation of German trade unions)
 Mike Sommer (born 1934), American football player
 Mike Sommer (born 1977), American author and podcaster in the collectible sports card genre
 Peter Sommer, Danish singer-songwriter
 Ralf J. Sommer, German biologist specializing in evolutionary developmental biology
 Ralph Frederick Sommer (1898–1971), one of the endodontics pioneers
 Raymond Sommer (1906–1950), French racing driver
 Renate Sommer (born 1958), German politician (CDU)
 Rich Sommer (born 1978), American actor
 Robert Sommer, distinguished professor of psychology
 Robert Sommer (psychiatrist) (1864–1937), German psychiatrist and genealogist
 Roger Sommer, French aviator
 Roy Sommer (born 1957), American ice hockey player
 Scott Sommer (1951–1993), American author
Thelma Thall “Tybie” Sommer, née Thelma Thall (born 1924), American two-time world table tennis champion.
 Theo Sommer (1930–2022), German journalist
 Tim Sommer, American musician and record producer
 Vladimír Sommer (1921–1997), Czech composer
 William Sommer (1867–1949), American modernist painter
 Yann Sommer (born 1988), Swiss footballer

In fiction
Dr Jochen Sommer, the fictional editor answering readers' questions (agony uncle) of the German youth magazine Bravo
The Story of Mr Sommer, a German novel
Sommer (TV series), a Danish TV-drama aired on DR1 in 2008
Bobbi "Blade" Sommer, a character from Batman Beyond

See also 

 Sommer Gentry, American mathematician
 Sommers (surname)
 Somers (surname)
 Zomer
 Eli Somer (born 1951), professor of clinical psychology

Danish-language surnames
German-language surnames
Surnames from nicknames